2015–16 Season Play-off for the 2015–16 Hong Kong football season is the 4th season of the tournament.

The play-off semi-finals are played in one match each, contested by the teams who finished in 2nd place in the Premier League table, the winners of the Senior Challenge Shield, the champions of the FA Cup and the champions of the League Cup. The winners of the semi-finals go through to the final, with the winner of the final gaining participation for the 2017 AFC Champions League qualifying play-off.

As Eastern won the Senior Shield and Kitchee won the League Cup, as well as coming in 2nd place in the Premier League, teams therefore finishing in 3rd and 4th place in the Hong Kong Premier League entered.

Qualified

Premier League

Senior Challenge Shield

The winners of the Senior Challenge Shield will guarantee a place in the play-off.

Winners:
 Eastern

FA Cup

The winners of the FA Cup will guarantee a place in the play-off.

Winners:
 Pegasus

League Cup

The winners of the League Cup will guarantee a place in the play-off.

Winners:
 Kitchee

Calendar

Bracket

Fixtures and results

Semi-finals

Final

References 

Football competitions in Hong Kong
Season Play-off